Elena Vaenga (real name Yelena Vladimirovna Khrulyova; born 27 January 1977 in Severomorsk, Russia) is a Russian singer, songwriter and actress. Her style of singing is author song, folk rock, chanson and others. Vaenga's repertoire includes her own compositions, traditional ballads and folk songs, and songs derived from classical Russian poems.

Her stage name is the former name of her birthplace, Severomorsk. Her mother was educated as a chemist and her father was an engineer. Her maternal grandfather was a rear-admiral and her paternal grandparents were natives of Saint Petersburg (formerly Leningrad), and survived the Nazi siege of that city during World War II.

In 2012 she gave birth to a son in Saint Petersburg. The son's father is Roman Sadyrbaev, her husband since 2016.

Vaenga performed throughout Russia, including several appearances in the Kremlin. She also performed in Israel, Germany, and Ukraine.

The newspaper Komsomolskaya Pravda called her "one of the most popular Russian singers". In 2011, Vaenga ranked 9th in the list of the most successful Russian entertainers, with a total income for that year of over six million dollars.

Discography 
 2003 —  Портрет (Portret / Portrait)
 2003 —  Флейта 1 (Fleyta 1 / Flute 1)
 2005 —  Флейта 2 (Fleyta 2 / Flute 2)
 2005 —  Белая птица (Belaya Ptista / The White Bird)
 2006 —  Шопен (Chopin)
 2007 —  Абсент (Абсент / Absinthe)
 2007 —  Дюны (Duny / Dunes)
 2008 —  Клавиши (Klavishi / Keys)
 2012 —  Лена (Lena)
 2015 —  New
 2018 – 1+1

References

External links 

 Official website
 Her YouTube channel
 
 Elena Vaenga at the Forbes

1977 births
People from Severomorsk
Russian bards
Living people
Russian women singer-songwriters
21st-century Russian singers
21st-century Russian women singers
Russian chanson
Winners of the Golden Gramophone Award